Balbir Singh is an INC politician from Haryana State in India. He is the MLA for Israna.

References

1974 births
Haryana MLAs 2019–2024
Indian National Congress politicians from Haryana
Living people